Stelechantha arcuata is a species of plant in the family Rubiaceae. It is endemic to Cameroon.  Its natural habitat is subtropical or tropical moist lowland forests. It is threatened by habitat loss.

References

Flora of Cameroon
Stelechantha
Critically endangered plants
Taxonomy articles created by Polbot